Rune Factory 3: A Fantasy Harvest Moon is a 2009 simulation role-playing video game developed by Neverland for the Nintendo DS. It was published in Japan by Marvelous Entertainment, in North America by Natsume in 2010, and in Europe by Rising Star Games in 2011. It is the fourth game in the Rune Factory series. A remaster, Rune Factory 3 Special, was released for the Nintendo Switch in Japan in March 2023, followed by a worldwide release for both Switch and Windows in September.

Gameplay
Like the other Rune Factory games, the story begins with a character (Micah) who has lost his memory showing up in a small town. He is greeted by a girl (Shara), and is tasked with raising the town's farm. There are multiple avenues to make money, such as growing crops, fishing, and foraging. In addition, there are dungeons to explore. Micah can fight these monsters, and certain monsters can be tamed.

The game features new AI with dynamic schedules, as well as new battle commands and NPC interaction. Other changes in the game include: the player can transform into a golden Wooly (bipedal sheep-like creatures), plants can be grown underground under a special tree that Micah lives in, villagers can now join you in battle and lend you their skills as battle companions, and the game's new multiplayer mode lets up to three players work together to conquer dungeons with rare items and monsters more interactively than the previous games.

Plot
Tasked with raising the farm around the massive Sharance Tree, Micah discovers that for reasons unknown the tree has not bloomed for fifty years, and since then the land started decaying. After recovering the ability to transform into a golden wooly, he discovers that he is a half-monster and decides to keep his true nature a secret from the other villagers. He also makes contact with a Univir settlement located in a desert, but only interacts with them in his wooly form, hiding his human persona from them. He learns that both the villagers and the Univir had a friendly relationship in the past, but since a few decades before, they started to estrange each other. However, Micah eventually gains each faction's trust and manages to have them settle their differences and resume their peaceful coexistence after regaining his memory which was sealed in mysterious orbs and unlocked after defeating bosses and revealing his secret to them.

When Micah finally becomes engaged with one of the game's heroines, his bride mysteriously disappears on their wedding day and he sets into a ruin located on the outskirts of the village to find her. Reaching the deepest part of the ruins, Micah is forced to confront Aquaticus, a large water dragon who is keeping his lover imprisoned, claiming that humans and Univir should never become together and he, a half-monster should not marry into neither race. Seeing Micah's determination to fight for his bethroed, Aquaticus reveals that all was part of his plan to have both humans and Univir truly reconciled as only then the Sharance Tree could be fully restored to prevent the world's destruction. The game ends with Micah's marriage with his bride and the Sharance Tree in full bloom once more.

Reception

Rune Factory 3: A Fantasy Harvest Moon received "generally favorable reviews" according to the review aggregation website Metacritic.  In Japan, Famitsu gave it a score of one nine and three eights for a total of 33 out of 40.

Notes

References

External links

Official website

2009 video games
Action role-playing video games
Marvelous Entertainment
Multiplayer and single-player video games
Neverland (company) games
Nintendo DS games
Nintendo Switch games
Nintendo Wi-Fi Connection games
Rising Star Games games
Role-playing video games
Rune Factory
Simulation video games
Video games developed in Japan
Windows games